Pierre-Hugues Herbert and Michał Przysiężny were the defending champions, but Prysiężny chose not to participate. Herbert played alongside Nicolas Mahut, but lost in the quarterfinals to Aisam-ul-Haq Qureshi and Gilles Simon.

Raven Klaasen and Marcelo Melo won the title, defeating Juan Sebastián Cabal and Robert Farah in the final, 7–6(7–5), 3–6, [10–7].

Seeds

Draw

Draw

Qualifying

Seeds

Qualifiers
  Steve Johnson /  Sam Querrey

Lucky losers
  Andre Begemann /  Artem Sitak

Qualifying draw

References
 Main Draw

Rakuten Japan Open Tennis Championships - Doubles